Szalonna can refer to:

Szalonna (bacon), Hungarian bacon usually cooked on a stick over a campfire
Szalonna (town), in Hungary